Dee Valley Dragons are an amateur rugby league team based in Corwen, North Wales.

History
Dee Valley Dragons were established in 2011 by coach Mike Parry, they played a series of friendlies throughout their inaugural season and took their place in the North Wales Championship for the start of the 2012 season. One Dee Valley Dragons player; Dafydd Lloyd represented Wales Dragon Hearts against Scotland A at Eirias Park, Colwyn Bay on Saturday 24 August 2013. Wales won this match by 64 - 18.

See also

List of rugby league clubs in Britain

References

External links

Welsh rugby league teams
Rugby clubs established in 2011